Brighton is a town in East Sussex and constituent part of the city of Brighton and Hove.

Brighton may also refer to:

Places

United Kingdom

 Brighton, East Sussex, England
 Brighton, Cornwall, a hamlet in Cornwall, England
 Brightons, a village in Falkirk, Scotland

Australia 
 Brighton, Queensland, a suburb of Brisbane
 Brighton, South Australia, a coastal suburb of Adelaide
 North Brighton, South Australia, adjacent suburb of Adelaide
 South Brighton, South Australia, adjacent suburb of Adelaide
 City of Brighton (South Australia), a former local government area
 District Council of Brighton, a former local government area
 Electoral district of Brighton (South Australia), a former electoral district in South Australia
 Brighton, Tasmania, a suburb of Hobart
 Brighton Council, a local government area in Tasmania
 Electoral district of Brighton (Tasmania), a former electoral district in Tasmania
 Brighton, Victoria, a suburb of Melbourne
 Brighton East, Victoria, adjacent suburb of Melbourne
 City of Brighton, Victoria, a former local government area
 Electoral district of Brighton, an electoral district in Victoria
 Brighton-Le-Sands, New South Wales, a suburb of Sydney

Canada 
 Brighton Parish, New Brunswick
Brighton, Charlottetown, Prince Edward Island
Brighton, Digby, Nova Scotia, a community in Digby County
 Brighton, Newfoundland and Labrador, a town
 Brighton, Ontario, a town
 Brighton, Shelburne, Nova Scotia, a community in Shelburne County

New Zealand 
 Brighton, New Zealand, Otago region, a town

Trinidad and Tobago 
 Brighton, Trinidad and Tobago, a Locality near La Brea, Trinidad and Tobago

United States 
(Alphabetical by state)
 Brighton, Alabama, a city
 Brighton, Colorado, a home rule municipality
 Brighton Seminole Indian Reservation, Florida
 Brighton, Georgia, an unincorporated community
 Brighton, Illinois, a village
 Brighton Park, Chicago, Illinois, a neighbourhood
 Brighton, Indiana, an unincorporated community
 Brighton, Iowa, a city
 Brighton Plantation, Maine
 Brighton, Boston, a dissolved municipality and current neighborhood of Boston, Massachusetts
 Brighton, Michigan, a suburb in metro Detroit
 Brighton, Missouri, an unincorporated community
 Brighton, Erie County, New York, an unincorporated area in the town of Tonawanda
 Brighton, Franklin County, New York, a town
 Brighton, Monroe County, New York, a town and census-designated place
 Brighton, Syracuse, New York, an official neighborhood of Syracuse
 Brighton Beach, New York, a neighborhood of Brooklyn, New York City, sometimes referred to merely as Brighton
 Brighton, Clark County, Ohio, an unincorporated community
 Brighton, Lorain County, Ohio, an unincorporated community
 Brighton, Oregon, an unincorporated community
 Brighton, Tennessee, a town
 Brighton Ski Resort, Utah
 Brighton, Utah, an unincorporated community
 Brighton, Vermont, a town
 Brighton, Seattle, Washington, a neighborhood
 Brighton (community), Kenosha County, Wisconsin, an unincorporated community
 Brighton, Kenosha County, Wisconsin, a town
 Brighton, Marathon County, Wisconsin, a town
 Brighton Township (disambiguation)

Schools 
 Brighton College, a boarding and day school established in 1845 in Brighton, England
 Brighton High School (disambiguation)
 University of Brighton, with five campuses in Brighton, Eastbourne and Hastings, England

Sports 
 Brighton & Hove Albion F.C., a football club who compete in the English premier league 
 Brighton & Hove Albion W.F.C., a women's football club associated with the above
 Brighton Football Club (RFU), one of the oldest rugby clubs in England
 Brighton Football Club (Tasmania), an Australian rules football club
 Brighton Football Club, a former Australian rules football club based in the Melbourne suburb of Brighton

Train lines
 BMT Brighton Line, a New York City subway line
 Brighton Main Line, a railway line between London and Brighton

Vessels
 HMS Brighton, the name of three ships of the Royal Navy
 PS Brighton, a former Manly ferry on Sydney Harbour
 SS Brighton, the name of three ships of the London, Brighton and South Coast Railway

Other uses 
 Brighton, a character in the video game Mario Party 6
 Brighton Collectibles, a corporation that sells handbags, jewelry, shoes and more

See also
 
 
 Bright (disambiguation), for towns named Bright (ie "Bright town")
 Brighton High School (disambiguation)
 Brighton College (disambiguation)
 Brighton School (disambiguation)
 Brighton Beach (disambiguation)
 New Brighton (disambiguation)